= Peyman Farahavar =

Iranian poet, activist, and political prisoner

Peyman Farahavar (also spelled Peyman Farah-Avar; pen name Sheyda) is an Iranian Gilak poet and environmental activist from Gilan Province. His poetry and activism have addressed environmental destruction, deforestation, land sales, and social justice, including the rights of local farmers.

== Arrest and death sentence ==
Farahavar was arrested in 2024 and detained at Lakan Prison in Rasht. In May 2025, Branch One of the Rasht Revolutionary Court sentenced him to death on charges of baghi (armed rebellion) and moharebeh (enmity against God). He also received a three-month prison sentence for propaganda against the state.

The Supreme Court of Iran upheld his death sentence in September 2025. In May 2026, Iran International reported that the Supreme Court had rejected his request for judicial review. Sources close to his family, cited by human rights organisations, said that the charges were related to his poetry and protest activities concerning social justice and civil rights.

On November 11, 2026, the Human Rights Activists News Agency (HRANA) reported that his case had been referred to the Sentence Enforcement Branch following the rejection of his request for a retrial. Iran Human Rights also reported that he faced an imminent risk of execution.

== International response ==
Following the death sentence, PEN Berlin condemned the verdict and called for Farahavar's release. His case was also featured at the organisation's 2025 congress, under the title Poetry Under Sentence of Death.

On November 18, 2026, PEN America and PEN Norway issued a joint statement warning that Farahavar faced an imminent risk of execution and calling for his release.

On the same day, the French newspaper Libération published an open letter signed by more than 350 writers and representatives of international organisations, calling for the suspension of his execution.

The campaign received further coverage from international media, including The New Arab, France's TF1 Info and Germany's Deutschlandfunk.
